John Lewis Smith Jr. (September 20, 1912 – September 4, 1992) was a United States district judge of the United States District Court for the District of Columbia.

Education and career

Born in Washington, D.C., Smith received an Artium Baccalaureus degree from Princeton University in 1935, a Bachelor of Laws from Georgetown Law in 1938, and a Master of Laws from the same institution in 1939. He was an Assistant United States Attorney for the District of Columbia from 1940 to 1946, and was in the United States Army during World War II, serving as an Air Corps Lieutenant Colonel from 1942 to 1946. He was in private practice in Washington, D.C. from 1946 to 1956. He was Commissioner of the District of Columbia Public Utilities Commission from 1956 to 1957. He was an associate judge of the District of Columbia Court of General Sessions from 1957 to 1959, becoming chief judge of that court from 1959 to 1966.

Federal judicial services

On October 6, 1966, Smith was nominated by President Lyndon B. Johnson to a seat on the United States District Court for the District of Columbia vacated by Judge Luther Youngdahl. Smith was confirmed by the United States Senate on October 20, 1966, and received his commission on November 3, 1966. He served as Chief Judge and as a member of the Judicial Conference of the United States from 1981 to 1982. He was a Judge of the Foreign Intelligence Surveillance Court from 1982 to 1988. He assumed senior status on January 31, 1983. Smith served in that capacity until his death on September 4, 1992, in Washington, D.C.

Notable order

In 1977, Smith ordered all of the FBI's records concerning Martin Luther King Jr. to be sealed in the National Archives and Records Administration for 50 years.

References

Sources
 

1912 births
1992 deaths
20th-century American judges
20th-century American lawyers
Judges of the United States District Court for the District of Columbia
Lawyers from Washington, D.C.
Military personnel from Washington, D.C.
Princeton University alumni
United States district court judges appointed by Lyndon B. Johnson
United States Army officers
Judges of the Superior Court of the District of Columbia
Judges of the United States Foreign Intelligence Surveillance Court
Assistant United States Attorneys